Lance Allen "Lane" Bray (September 21, 1928 – September 9, 2015) was an American politician in the state of Washington. He served the 8th district from 1991 to 1995. He attended Lake Forest College and was a research scientist and chemist. He was also a former mayor of Richland, Washington. Bray died in Richland, Washington.

References

1928 births
2015 deaths
People from Highland Park, Illinois
People from Richland, Washington
Lake Forest College alumni
Mayors of places in Washington (state)
Democratic Party members of the Washington House of Representatives
American chemists